Casino del Real Club de Fútbol was a football team based in Melilla. Founded in 2003, the team played in Tercera División – Group 9. The club's home ground was Estadio La Espiguera.

In 2012, Casino del Real became the reserve team of UD Melilla. One year later, the team changed its name to UD Melilla B, and abandoned their former status.

Season to season

4 seasons in Tercera División

External links
Official website
Futbolme team profile 

Football clubs in Melilla
Association football clubs established in 2003
2003 establishments in Spain
Association football clubs disestablished in 2013
2013 disestablishments in Spain